At least seven ships of the French Navy have borne the name Sirène:

 , a  launched in 1795 and broken up in 1825
 , a  launched in 1823 and stricken in 1861
 Sirène, a submarine renamed shortly after being laid down as  
 , a  
 , a  launched in 1925
 , a  formerly HMS Spiteful in French service from 1952 to 1958
 , a  completed in 1970 and struck in 1996

French Navy ship names